Česká Třebová is a town in Ústí nad Orlicí District in the Pardubice Region of the Czech Republic. It has about 15,000 inhabitants. The historic town centre is well preserved and is protected by law as an urban monument zone.

Administrative parts

Villages of Kozlov, Lhotka, Parník, Skuhrov and Svinná are administrative parts of Česká Třebová.

Etymology
The name Třebová is derived from the old Czech verb triebiti, which meant "chop down, clear". The name refers to the founding of settlements on the site of forest that had to be cut down first. First the name of the river Třebovka was created, then it was transferred to the settlements along the river. The attribute Česká (meaning "Bohemian") was added to distinguish it from Moravská Třebová.

Geography
The town lies in the valley of the river Třebovka. It lies in the Svitavy Uplands.

History
The first written mention of Česká Třebová is from 1278. It was founded during the reign of King Ottokar II of Bohemia as a town with regular ground plan and rectangular square in its centre.

In 1304, King Wenceslaus II gave it to the Zbraslav Monastery and later, in the 14th century, the town belonged to the bishops of Litomyšl. In the 15th and 16th centuries, the town prospered. It was owned by various noble families, including the Pernštejn family and the Bohdanecký of Hodkov family, which supported textile crafts and had the Renaissance bell tower built.

Due to the Thirty Years' War, plagues and fires, it became poor and insignificant. This state lasted until the middle of the 19th century. In 1845, the railway from Prague to Olomouc via Česká Třebová was built and in 1849, the railway from Brno to Česká Třebová was built. This greatly aided the town development, helped to create new jobs and attract new people.

Demographics

Transport

Česká Třebová railway station is a major railway junction linking Prague with two pan-European corridors.

Sport
The town is home to a 4th league ice hockey club, HC Kohouti Česká Třebová, which plays at the "Na Skále" arena with a capacity of 1,200.

Sights

The historic centre is located around the Staré Square. The landmark of the square is the town hall, probably built in 1547. In the middle of the square is the Marian column from 1706. The Church of Saint James the Great was built in the Neoclassical style in 1794–1801. There are several valuable late Baroque statues from 1712–1719 around the church. The deanery next to the church is from 1783–1786. The church is connected to the square by two parallel streets, Klácelova and Hýblova. In Klácelova street is the Neoclassical house no. 11 built in 1804 that houses the town museum and the tourist information centre.

The Chapel of Saint Catherine was built in the early 13th century and is older than the town. The originally Romanesque rotunda was mixed with other styles during several reconstructions.

Kozlov is known for the cottage which Max Švabinský often visited and painted here. Today there is an exposition of the town museum. In Kozlov there is also the wooden Chapel of the Virgin mary from 1753.

Notable people
František Klácel (1808–1882), author and philosopher
Max Švabinský (1873–1962), painter; worked here
Fritz Freisler (1881–1955), Austrian screenwriter and film director
Zdeňka Baldová (1885–1958), actress
Helen Hughes (1928–2013),  Australian economist; lived here until 1939
Libuše Dušková (born 1930), linguist

Twin towns – sister cities

Česká Třebová is twinned with:
 Agrate Brianza, Italy
 Horní Lhota, Czech Republic
 Oława, Poland
 Svit, Slovakia

References

External links

Information about Czech cities 
Virtual show

 
Cities and towns in the Czech Republic
Populated places in Ústí nad Orlicí District